Leon Còrdas (Siran 1913 - Montpellier 1987) was an acclaimed Occitan playwright who also wrote poems, novels and short-stories. Còrdas tried his hand at acting and directing.

Works

Drama
La Font de Bonas Gràcias, (1954), Théodore Aubanel prize in 1955
Menèrba 1210, (1985)

Poetry
Aquarèla, (1946)
Branca tòrta, (1964)
Dire son si, (1974)

Prose
Los Macarèls, (1973)
Sèt pans, (1977)
La Batalha dels teules, (1979)

External links
 Montpellier-Agglomération, in French
 Occitan poetry  980-2006, in English
 Seneca, in Occitan

Occitan-language writers
1987 deaths
1913 births